"White Horse" is a song by American singer-songwriter Taylor Swift, taken from her second studio album, Fearless (2008). It was released as the album's second single on December 8, 2008, by Big Machine Records. Written by Swift and Liz Rose, "White Horse" is about a protagonist's disillusionment after she realizes her love interest is not an ideal Prince Charming like she thought. The lyrics incorporate fairy-tale imagery mentioning princes, princesses, angels, and white horses. Produced by Nathan Chapman and Swift, it is a ballad combining country and pop with acoustic guitar, piano, and cello.

Music critics lauded "White Horse" for its somber production and engaging storytelling, with many picking it as an album highlight. At the 2010 Grammy Awards, it won Best Country Song and Best Female Country Vocal Performance. In the United States, the single peaked at number 13 on the Billboard Hot 100 and number two on the Hot Country Songs chart, and was certified double platinum by the Recording Industry Association of America (RIAA). It also charted in Australia, Canada, and the United Kingdom, and received certifications in the former two countries.
 
Trey Fanjoy directed the song's music video, which depicts Swift reliving many memories with her ex-boyfriend after having ended their relationship through a phone call. Swift performed "White Horse" live at awards ceremonies including the 2008 American Music Awards and the 2009 Grammy Awards, on her Fearless Tour (2009–2010), and on select dates of her later tours including the Red Tour (2013–2014), the 1989 World Tour (2015), and the Reputation Stadium Tour (2018).

Background
Swift wrote the lyrics for "White Horse" in December 2006, and commenced composing the song almost a year before the release of Fearless, weeks after composing Fearless lead single "Love Story". The two songs were inspired by the same person, but were written at different stages of the relationship and are therefore quite disparate lyrically. Swift first solely wrote the first verse of "White Horse". She then made a phone call to Liz Rose, co-writer of most tracks on Swift's eponymous debut studio album, Taylor Swift (2006), asking for her aid in finishing the song; the two completed writing the song in approximately forty-five minutes. Swift never actually dated the subject of the song, despite considering it. The inspiration came when Swift realised her notion of him as a Prince Charming was incorrect. She said he was the person who triggered the song, but, once in the midst of writing it, drifted in direction. It focused on the initial moment where she recognized the relationship was over. She said everything after that particular moment centered on recuperation and, because of that, considered it the most solemn aspect of a breakup: "To me, 'White Horse' is about what, in my opinion, is the most heart-breaking part of a break-up – that moment when you realize that all the dreams you had, all those visions you had of being with this person, all that disappears." About the difference in themes between "White Horse" and "Love Story", Swift explained that in divergent scenarios, she regarded fairytales in different manners. She attributed the fact that because she did not expect to go through the event, then she became more inclined to come in terms with reality.

The song was not originally intended to be included on Fearless, due to Swift believing solemness was already represented accurately on the album; therefore, Swift was planning on including the track on her third studio album, what would become Speak Now in 2010. However, when Swift's Los Angeles managing agency set up an appointment with the executive producers of her favorite television series, Grey's Anatomy, Betsy Beers and Shonda Rhimes, they discussed including Swift's music on the series. Swift chose to play them "White Horse" live with an acoustic guitar. Beers and Rhimes were very impressed and told Swift they would respond her via telephone as soon as they could. Swift decided to not include the track on Fearless, until the producers responded, which they did not for some time. When Grey's Anatomys representatives called, Swift and Nathan Chapman recorded the song immediately, sent a CD to them, and they decided to use it on the television series. "White Horse" debuted on the fifth season premiere of Grey's Anatomy, "Dream a Little Dream of Me", on September 25, 2008. "White Horse" was released to US country radio on December 8, 2008, by Big Machine Records.

Composition

"White Horse" is a country song with a length of three minutes and 55 seconds. It is set in common time and has a tempo of 92 beats per minute. An understated ballad, it is written in the key of C major; Swift's vocals span from G3 to A4. "White Horse" follows the chord progression C5–F(add)2–Am7–F(add)2. The song is based upon a pop hook, and has an instrumentation mainly based on acoustic guitar and soft piano, with accents of cello. The production, however, is sparse, leaving an emphasis on Swift's soft and breathy vocals.

The lyrics of "White Horse" are written in first person and has a theme of pain and disillusionment, with the narrator reflecting on an occasion when a relationship, which seemed like a fairytale in the beginning, fell apart: "I'm not a princess, this ain't a fairytale/ I'm not the one you'll sweep off her feet/ Lead her up the stairwell." Josh Love in The Village Voice found the lyrics to be told from the clear perspective of a "reborn realist". The narrator realizes that the dreamy boyfriend did not live up to his knighthood, and was not the ideal Prince Charming as she has hoped. Due to the heartbreak, she finally escapes from the small town that she resides in. Critics noted the disparity between the themes of "White Horse" and the preceding single "Love Story", which features a fairy-tale-inspired narrative with a happy ending.

Critical reception
"White Horse" garnered acclaim from critics.  August Brown of The Los Angeles Times compared the song with Dolly Parton's "Jolene" (1973), saying Parton would have recognized her own predicament in "White Horse" and may have congratulated Swift for attempting to move on. Jonathan Keefe of Slant Magazine called "White Horse" a "lovely ballad" with a prominent hook and deemed it "easily the best song" on Fearless. However, Keefer stated, "Even 'White Horse' [...] makes use of a well-worn, clichéd image that Swift doesn't use in any novel way." Josh Love of The Village Voice thought "preternatural wisdom and inclusiveness" shined through the lyrics and theme of "White Horse"; Love also mentioned that it was one of Fearless' "great songs". Lucy Davies of the BBC said it demonstrated how repetitive the lyrical themes on Fearless were. She noted Swift recycled the phrase "face of an angel" from the album's previous track, "Hey Stephen". An uncredited review from Billboard stated, "The second single from Taylor Swift's top-selling CD is a beautiful, understated ballad that showcases her skill with a lyric and shines a spotlight on her signature tender, heart-on-her-sleeve vocals." The review stated that the latter was accomplished by the song's production, which made Swift's vocal performance more palpable and emotive. The review also complimented the song, as something everyone could relate to. Kate Kiefer of Paste recognized it to be one of Swift's best songs. Newsday's Glenn Gamboa featured "White Horse" at number nine on a list of the 10 best songs of 2008. At the 52nd Grammy Awards, "White Horse" won the Grammy Awards for Best Country Song and Best Female Country Vocal Performance.

Commercial performance
On the week ending November 29, 2008, "White Horse" debuted and peaked at number thirteen on the Billboard Hot 100. Its appearance, along with six other songs, on the chart tied Swift with Hannah Montana (Miley Cyrus) for the female act to have the most songs charting on the Billboard Hot 100 in the same week, a record later surpassed by Swift herself when she charted eleven songs at once in 2010. The following week, the song dropped to number fifty-six, and, on the week ending April 25, 2009, it spent its last week on the Billboard Hot 100 at number forty-four, after a total of twenty-two weeks on the chart. The song is one of thirteen songs from Fearless charted within the top forty of the Billboard Hot 100, breaking the record for the most top forty entries from a single album. The single was certified platinum by the Recording Industry Association of America for shipments exceeding one million copies. As of November 2017, "White Horse" has sold 2 million copies in the United States.

The single debuted at number thirty-seven on Billboard Hot Country Songs on the week-ending December 12, 2008. It jumped at number twenty-six on the following week, the biggest jump of the week. On the week ending February 14, 2009, it entered the top ten at number ten, scoring Swift's seventh consecutive top ten hit on the chart. It peaked at number two on the week-ending April 4, 2009 and held there on the following week before dropping at number seven. It charted for a total of twenty weeks on Billboard Hot Country Songs.

"White Horse" debuted at number twenty-seven in Canada on the week ending November 29, 2008. On the week ending January 24, 2009, "White Horse" peaked at number forty-three in Canada. It was certified gold by Music Canada for sales of 40,000 digital downloads. In Australia, the track entered at its peak at number forty-one on the week ending February 22, 2009. In United Kingdom, "White Horse" debuted and peaked at number sixty on the week ending March 21, 2009. It stayed on United Kingdom for two weeks.

Music video
The accompanying music video for "White Horse" was directed by Trey Fanjoy, who directed the majority of Swift's prior videos. Swift commented that Fanjoy was her first choice to film the video because she understood the direction Swift wanted to take and how to make the video different than the prior ones they filmed. The video's plot centered on infidelity. However, because the theme had appeared on the video for "Picture to Burn", the scenario was reversed, rather than removed entirely, for Swift thought it was inevitable to include it. It was conceptualized so that Swift was not the person who someone was unfaithful to, but rather the one who someone was unfaithful with: "This girl falls in love with this guy and he's perfect. He's adorable. He's charming. He's endearing. She falls in love with him. Then, she comes to realize that he's been leading a double life. He was already in a relationship years before he ever met her [...] You find out that I'm the one that was ruining a relationship without even knowing it." Swift chose actor Stephen Colletti to portray the role of her love interest. She had previously seen him on the reality television series Laguna Beach: The Real Orange County, where she acknowledged him to be "cute", and later on One Tree Hill, where she was impressed by his acting skills; thus, Colletti was contacted to portray the character. Swift chose Colletti primarily because of his sweet and endearing demeanor. As a result, the character would seem very loyal, as though he would never betray his partner. Therefore, others did not expect for him to betray Swift either. "That's always the hardest thing, when someone has you fooled so much that you think they're never gonna hurt you. And then they do. That's when you get the worst heartbreak", Swift said.

The video was shot in one day in January 2009 in Nashville, Tennessee. Frolicking scenes between Swift and Colletti were filmed first; the lunch, outdoor, and indoor scenes followed. Coincidentally, on the day of filming, it rained heavily, something which encouraged Swift, since it corresponded to the video's gloomy and dark feel. Swift said it aided in making the video less colorful lighting-wise, and more fixated on muted tones. The last scenes were more difficult for Swift because they involved crying. She attributed the difficulty to the number of people surrounding her and watching, something she was not accustomed to. However, Fanjoy, who was once an actress, guided her into thinking about what made her most solemn, and completing the scene effectively. Fanjoy said the scenes demonstrated what an exceptional actress Swift was, adding she took direction very well. The scene took approximately three hours to film.

The video premiered on February 7, 2009, on CMT. The video starts with close-ups of Swift's and Colletti's mouths as they speak via telephone. He begins, "All I want is you. Do you love me?" She affirms, and he asks for another chance. The video transitions to Swift sitting on the living room floor, next to a fireplace. She performs as she flashbacks to memories with Colletti. The two frolic on a brown couch and play with a deck of cards. The video then transitions to Swift and her friend (played by her real-life friend Teah Spears) having lunch at a restaurant, where Swift's friend informs her of Colletti's betrayal. Then, Swift is seen walking on the streets during nighttime. She sees Colletti arriving at a house with groceries and, after staring at each other, a redheaded woman walks out of the house. In a panic, Swift runs away and the video transitions to the phone call, which commenced in the beginning of the video, with Colletti repeating, "Will you give me another chance?" A rapid flashback of cut-scenes is played and, after its conclusion, Swift denies his request, hangs up, and cries. As of May 20, 2021, the video has 151 million views on YouTube.

Accolades

Live performances

On her first televised performance of "White Horse", on November 23, 2008, at the 2008 American Music Awards, Swift donned a white evening gown as she sat on floral-patterned couch. While promoting the song, she later performed it at the Nomination Concert for the 51st Grammy Awards, where she coupled it in a medley with a cover of Brenda Lee's "I'm Sorry", and the AOL Sessions. Since, Swift has performed the track at the Studio 330 Sessions, the 2009 CMA Music Festival, the 2009 V Festival, and on Dancing with the Stars. Swift performed "White Horse" on all venues in 2009 and 2010 of her first headlining concert tour, the Fearless Tour. During the performances, Swift wore a pastel sundress as performed solely playing an acoustic guitar, standing at the edge of the stage's runway. In the concert on May 22, 2009, at Staples Center in Los Angeles, California, Swift sang "White Horse" in duet with American singer John Mayer. Reviewing the June 2, 2010 concert at Verizon Center in Washington, D.C., Dave McKenna of The Washington Post reported, "On 'White Horse,' the chorus of believers also joined in, and threw their young fists in the air to yell Swift's esteem-free but cathartic climax, 'I'm gonna find someone someday who might actually treat me well!'"

Swift performed the song during the second shows in Omaha, Los Angeles and Arlington during The Red Tour, The 1989 World Tour and reputation Stadium Tour respectively.

Personnel
Adapted from Fearless album liner notes
 Chad Carlson – recording engineer
 Nathan Chapman – producer
 Taylor Swift – producer
 Steve Blackmon – assistant mixer
 Justin Niebank – mixer

Charts

Weekly charts

Year-end charts

Certifications

"White Horse (Taylor's Version)"

Swift released a re-recorded version of "White Horse", titled "White Horse (Taylor's Version)", on April 9, 2021, as the fifth track from Fearless (Taylor's Version), the re-recorded version of Fearless. Before the re-recorded album's release, Swift contacted singer-songwriters Olivia Rodrigo and Conan Gray to preview a snippet of "White Horse (Taylor's Version)" on social media. In the re-recorded version, the cello in the introduction is richer and more resonant, and the outro is a little longer.

In The New York Times, Joe Coscarelli found the re-recorded version's production fresh and refined, an improvement from the original version. After Fearless (Taylor's Version) release, "White Horse (Taylor's Version)" peaked at number 72 on the Canadian Hot 100 and 99 on the ARIA Charts. It peaked at number 111 on the Billboard Global 200.

Personnel
Adapted from Fearless (Taylor's Version) album liner notes
 Christopher Rowe – vocals engineer, producer
 Taylor Swift – producer, lead vocals
 David Payne – recording engineer
 Derek Garten – additional engineer
 John Hanes – engineer
 Lowell Reynolds – assistant recording engineer, additional engineer
 Serban Ghenea – mixing
 Mike Meadows – acoustic guitar, background vocals
 Amos Heller – bass guitar
 Matt Billingslea – drums
 Paul Sidoti – piano
 Jonathan Yudkin – strings

Charts

References

2000s ballads
2008 singles
2008 songs
Country ballads
Music videos directed by Trey Fanjoy
Songs written by Liz Rose
Songs written by Taylor Swift
Taylor Swift songs
Song recordings produced by Taylor Swift
Song recordings produced by Nathan Chapman (record producer)
Song recordings produced by Chris Rowe
Big Machine Records singles